Hotchkiss were luxury cars made between 1903 and 1955 by the French company Hotchkiss et Cie in Saint-Denis, Paris. The badge for the marque showed a pair of crossed cannons, evoking the company's history as an arms manufacturer.

The company's first entry into car making came from orders for engine components such as crankshafts which were supplied to Panhard et Levassor, De Dion-Bouton and other pioneering companies and in 1903 they went on to make complete engines. Encouraged by two major car distributors, Mann & Overton of London and Fournier of Paris, Hotchkiss decided to start making their own range of cars and purchased a Mercedes Simplex for inspiration and Georges Terasse, previously of Mors, was taken on as designer.

Early cars
The first Hotchkiss car, a 17 CV four-cylinder model, appeared in 1903. The engine of the 20 CV type C was heavily based on the Mercedes Simplex except that wherever possible it used ball bearings rather than plain ones (including the crankshaft) and except the Hotchkiss drive. Six-cylinder models, the types L and O followed in 1907.

The ball bearing engines lasted until the 30CV type X of 1910. In that same year Hotchkiss moved into a smaller car market with the 2212cc type Z.

With the outbreak of World War I, the factory turned to war production and a subsidiary plant was opened in Coventry, England. Car production resumed in France 1919 with the pre war types AD, AD6, AF and AG. During World War I, they produced machine guns and tested them from the factory roof.

Inter war production
After an attempt to enter the luxury market with the AK, which did not get beyond the prototype stage, the company decided on a one model policy and introduced the Coventry designed AM in 1923. Later that year the Coventry plant was sold to Morris. Henry Mann Ainsworth (1884–1971) and  Alfred Herbert Wilde (1889 - 1930)  who had run it, moved to Paris to become general manager and chief engineer of the car division respectively.

In 1926 construction of the new factory in the Boulevard Ornano was completed and in 1929 Hotchkiss got hold of a steel press allowing in-house manufacture of steel bodies. The one model policy lasted until 1929 when the six-cylinder AM73 and AM80 models were announced. "73" and "80" stood for the bore of the engines used, a naming theme picked up again later in 1936 after a brief hiatus.

Although most cars had bodies that were factory built, Hotchkiss still was a luxury car brand, and so coachbuilder Veth and Sons built a small number of bodies for the AM80.

The AM models were replaced by a new range in 1933 with a new naming system. The 411 was an 11CV model with four-cylinder engine, the 413 a 13CV four and the 615, 617 and 620 were similar six-cylinder types. The 1936 686, which replaced the 620, was available as the high-performance Grand Sport and 1937 Paris-Nice with twin carburettors and these allowed Hotchkiss to win the Monte Carlo Rally in 1932, 1933, 1934, 1939, 1949 and 1950. The new naming scheme introduced in 1936 consisted of the number of cylinders, followed by the bore of the engine (in millimetres).

Second World War
The armament side of the company and the body stamping plant were nationalised in 1936 by the Front Populaire government. The car company in 1937 took over Amilcar. With re-armament speeding up they also started making military vehicles and light tanks. When France declared war, in September 1939, Hotchkiss were sitting on an army order for 1,900 H35 and H39 tanks powered by six-cylinder motors of respectively 3.5 and 6 litres capacity, and at the time of the German invasion in May 1940 they were still working through the order.   However, as the military situation deteriorated the decision was taken, on 20 May 1940, to abandon the Saint-Denis plant which by now was fully concentrated on war production.   There was a disorderly evacuation, initially towards Auxerre and then Moulins and then further towards the south, as employees desperately tried to keep information on the military production out of the hands of the Germans.   However, the national capitulation implicit in the signing of the armistice on 22 June left these efforts looking somewhat irrelevant, and most of the employees drifted back in the ensuing weeks.    Two exceptions were the Commercial Director, Jacques Jacobsen and the English born General Director, Henry Ainsworth, both of whom managed to avoid capture and to leave France.    During the war, like many businesses in the occupied (northern) zone, the company was obliged to work for the occupiers and was engaged in the repair of military vehicles.

In 1941 François Lehideux, then a leading member of the government’s economic team, called Jean-Pierre Peugeot and his General Director Maurice Jordan to a meeting, and invited them to study the possibility of taking a controlling share in the Hotchkiss business.   The suggestion from Lehideux derived from a German law dated 18 October 1940 authorising the confiscation of businesses controlled by Jews.   The Peugeot business itself had been operating, grudgingly, under overall German control since the summer of 1940.   In any event, in July 1942 Peugeot took a controlling share in the Hotchkiss business and towards the end of 1942 the names of Peugeot and Jordan were listed as members of the Hotchkiss board.  There is no evidence of any attempt to combine the operations of the two businesses, however: after the war Peugeot would in due course relinquish their holding in Hotchkiss.

With liberation in 1944, Ainsworth returned and production restarted in 1946 with the pre-war cars, a light truck and a tractor.

Post war models

After the war, car production resumed only slowly with fewer than 100 cars produced in each of 1946 and 1947, but by 1948 things were moving a little more rapidly with 460 Hotchkiss cars produced that year.   This volume of output was wholly insufficient to carry the company, although truck production was a little more successful with more than 2,300 produced in 1948, and it was support from the truck volumes and from the Jeep based M201 that enabled the company to stagger on as a car producer slightly more convincingly than some of France's other luxury car makers, at least until the mid-1950s.   The cars that represented the business in the second half of the 1940s were essentially the company's prewar designs.   The 2,312 cc four-cylinder car was now branded as the Hotchkiss 864 while the six-cylinder car was badged as the Hotchkiss 680 with a 3,016 cc engine or as the Hotchkiss 686 with the 3,485 cc engine.

The luxury automobile range was modernised in 1950 and a new car, the four-door saloon Anjou, was available on the 1350 (renamed from the 486) and 2050 (686) chassis. The high-end Anthéor cabriolet was added in 1952. Some Anthéor models were coachbuilt by Swiss coachbuilder Worblaufen.

In 1948 Hotchkiss had bought the rights to the Grégoire front-wheel-drive car and this car entered production in 1951 but was expensive. Sales in general were falling, and on reaching his 65th birthday in 1949 Ainsworth retired, to be succeeded in the top job by Maurice de Gary.   The Peugeot family sold their interest in the company. Coupé and cabriolet versions of the Hotchkiss-Grégoire were announced in 1951, but sales did not improve, and production stopped in 1952 after only 247 were made.

Hotchkiss had made 2.700 cars in 1951. The Grégoire design had integral construction, independent suspension all round, a 2.2 Litre flat-four engine and front wheel drive. Claimed top speed was 95 mph. Buyers did not welcome its smooth shape. Endless teething troubles brought production to a complete standstill in 1952. Hotchkiss produced 230 cars of all their models in 1953. When the factory finally closed there had been just 250 Hotchkiss-Grégoires built. In 1955 Citroën introduced the DS19 and Peugeot its 403. Aside from the Grégoire design Hotchkiss could only offer pre-war designs. Export sales were limited by the failure to provide left-hand-drive cars.

Merger and closure
Hotchkiss merged with Delahaye, another French luxury car brand, in 1954 to become Société Hotchkiss-Delahaye, but car production stopped in 1955 to be replaced by licence built Hotchkiss M201 Jeeps. In 1956 the company was taken over by Brandt, a household appliance maker, to become Hotchkiss-Brandt, who were again taken over in 1966 by Thomson-Houston.  Military vehicles were made until 1967 and trucks until 1971.

See also
 Delahaye
 Delage
 Talbot-Lago

References

External links

Defunct motor vehicle manufacturers of France
Car manufacturers of France
Luxury motor vehicle manufacturers
French brands

Vehicle manufacturing companies established in 1903
Sports car manufacturers
Truck manufacturers of France